Piz Aul is a mountain of the Lepontine Alps, overlooking Vals in the canton of Graubünden.

References

External links
 Piz Aul on Hikr

Mountains of the Alps
Alpine three-thousanders
Mountains of Switzerland
Mountains of Graubünden
Lepontine Alps
Vals, Switzerland